The Copa Rommel Fernández is the third level of Panama's  national club championship. It was founded in 1996 and it is a seasonal tournament that lasts 2 months in which the champion is promoted to Liga Nacional de Ascenso. The tournament is named after Panamanian football legend Rommel Fernández. The tournament is presided by Lucas Fernández and managed by Panamanian Football Federation.

Since the championship is seasonal only, at the end of each competition each of the teams (except the champions) are relegated to their respective district leagues where they compete to earn a spot for the following season. Additionally, the team relegated from the Liga Nacional de Ascenso automatically holds a spot to compete in the Copa Rommel Fernández after the end of the second division championship.

Format
The tournament is divided into three zones which include the qualified teams from each respective provincial tournaments (see below) plus previous season Liga Nacional de Ascenso relegated team. Each province is represented by two teams except Chiriquí which is represented by four teams and Panamá with ten teams. Each team plays a single game against the other teams from their same zone, the two teams with most points in their respective zones will qualify to the final round.  The eight qualified teams play a knock out stage which starts with rounds of 16 and finishes with a two team final. The champion gains promotion to the Liga Nacional de Ascenso held that same year.

Qualification
In order to gain the right to play in this tournament each team has to first participate in their respective district leagues. The winners of each district league will later move on a provincial tournament. The champion and the runner-up of the provincial tournaments obtain the right to represent their province in the Copa Rommel Fernández held the following year.

Teams by Seasons

Past Champions & Runners-up

[*] Won after extra time
[**] Won penalty kick

References

 
3
Pan